Green lacewings are insects in the large family Chrysopidae of the order Neuroptera. There are about 85 genera and (differing between sources) 1,300–2,000 species in this widespread group. Members of the genera Chrysopa and Chrysoperla are very common in North America and Europe; they are very similar and many of their species have been moved from one genus to the other time and again, and in the nonscientific literature assignment to Chrysopa and Chrysoperla can rarely be relied upon. Since they are the most familiar neuropterans to many people, they are often simply called "lacewings". Since most of the diversity of Neuroptera are properly referred to as some sort of "lacewing", common lacewings is preferable.

Description and ecology

Green lacewings are delicate insects with a wingspan of  6 to over 65 mm, though the largest forms are tropical. They are characterized by a wide costal field in their wing venation, which includes the cross-veins. The bodies are usually bright green to greenish-brown, and the compound eyes are conspicuously golden in many species. The wings are usually translucent with a slight iridescence; some have green wing veins or a cloudy brownish wing pattern. The vernacular name "stinkflies", used chiefly for Chrysopa species but also for others (e.g. Cunctochrysa) refers to their ability to release a vile smell from paired prothoracic glands when handled.

Adults have tympanal organs at the forewings' base, enabling them to hear well. Some Chrysopa show evasive behavior when they hear a bat's ultrasound calls: when in flight, they close their wings (making their echolocational signature smaller) and drop down to the ground. Green lacewings also use substrate or body vibrations as a form of communication between themselves, especially during courtship. Species which are nearly identical morphologically may sometimes be separated more easily based on their mating signals. For example, the southern European Chrysoperla mediterranea looks almost identical to its northern relative C. carnea (Common Green Lacewing), but their courtship "songs" are very different; individuals of one species will not react to the other's vibrations.

Adults are crepuscular or nocturnal. They feed on pollen, nectar and honeydew supplemented with mites, aphids and other small arthropods, and some, namely Chrysopa, are mainly predatory. Others feed almost exclusively on nectar and similar substances, and have symbiotic yeasts in their digestive tract to help break down the food into nutrients.

Larvae have either a more slender "humpbacked" shape with a prominent bulge on the thorax, or are plumper, with long bristles jutting out from the sides. These bristles will collect debris and food remains – the empty integuments of aphids, most notably – that provide camouflage from birds.

Eggs are deposited at night, singly or in small groups;  one female produces some 100–200 eggs.  Eggs are placed on plants, usually where aphids are present nearby in numbers. Each egg is hung on a slender stalk about 1 cm long, usually on the underside of a leaf. Immediately after hatching, the larvae moult, then crawls up the egg stalk to feed. They are voracious predators, attacking most insects of suitable size, especially soft-bodied ones (aphids, caterpillars and other insect larvae, insect eggs, and at high population densities also each other). The larvae may also occasionally bite humans, possibly out of either aggression or hunger. Therefore, the larvae are colloquially known as  "aphid lions" (also spelled "aphidlions") or "aphid wolves", similar to the related antlions. Their senses are weakly developed, except that they are very sensitive to touch. Walking around in a haphazard fashion, the larvae sway their heads from one side to the other, and when they strike a potential prey object, the larva grasps it. Their maxillae are hollow, allowing a digestive secretion to be injected in the prey; the organs of an aphid can for example be dissolved by this in 90 seconds. Depending on environmental conditions, pupation which takes place in a cocoon takes about 1–3 weeks; species from temperate regions usually overwinter as a prepupa, though C. carnea overwinters as newly hatched adults.

Use in biological pest control
While depending on species and environmental conditions, some green lacewings will eat only about 150 prey items in their entire lives, in other cases 100 aphids will be eaten in a single week. Thus, in several countries, millions of such voracious Chrysopidae are reared for sale as biological control agents of insect and mite pests in agriculture and gardens. They are distributed as eggs, since as noted above they are highly aggressive and cannibalistic in confined quarters; the eggs hatch in the field. Their performance is variable; thus, there is interest in further research to improve the use of green lacewings as biological pest control. Species that have hitherto attracted wider study and are more or less readily available as captive-bred eggs to deposit out for hatching in pest-infested plant cultures are several members of Chrysoperla as well as Mallada signatus. They are a natural predator of the European corn borer, a moth that costs the US agriculture industry more than $1 billion annually in crop losses and population control.

Gardeners can attract these lacewings – and therefore ensure a steady supply of larvae – by using certain companion plants and tolerating beneficial weeds. Chrysopidae are attracted mainly by Asteraceae – e.g. calliopsis (Coreopsis), cosmos (Cosmos), sunflowers (Helianthus) and dandelion (Taraxacum) – and Apiaceae such as dill (Anethum) or angelica (Angelica).

Systematics and taxonomy

For a long time, green lacewings were considered close relatives of the pleasing lacewings (Dilaridae) and brown lacewings (Hemerobiidae) and placed in the superfamily Hemerobioidea. But this grouping does not appear to be natural and misled most significantly by the supposed hemerobioideans' plesiomorphic larvae. Today, the Hemerobioidea are usually considered monotypic, containing only the brown lacewings; the green lacewings seem to be very closely related to the osmylids (Osmylidae), which have much more advanced larvae superficially resembling those of the spongillaflies (Sisyridae) with which the spongillaflies were thus formerly allied. Thus the superfamily Osmyloidea – also monotypic following the spongillaflies' removal from there – is the closest living relative of green lacewings; some Mesozoic taxa have been placed in families even closer to Chrysopidae (Ascalochrysidae and Mesochrysopidae) and united with these to superfamily Chrysopoidea.

Selected genera

The living genera of Chrysopidae are divided into one very large and two smaller subfamilies; a few genera are not robustly assigned to either of these yet:

Subfamily Apochrysinae Handlirsch, 1908
 Apochrysa (including Anapochrysa, Lauraya, Nacaura, Oligochrysa, Synthochrysa)
 Domenechus
 Joguina – includes Lainius
 Loyola (including Claverina)
 Nobilinus
 Nothancyla
 Pimachrysa

Subfamily Chrysopinae
 Almost 60 genera, see article.

Subfamily Nothochrysinae Navas, 1910
 Asthenochrysa
 Dictyochrysa
 Hypochrysa
 Kimochrysa
 Nothochrysa McLachlan, 1868
 Pamochrysa
 Triplochrysa

Incertae sedis
 Cladochrysa
 Maculatae
 Sinochrysa Yang, 1992 (Nothochrysinae?)
 Tibetochrysa Yang, 1988 (Chrysopinae?)
 Tolmeron
 Xanthochrysa Yang & Yang, 1991 (Chrysopinae?)
 Yunchrysopa Yang & Wang, 1994 (Chrysopinae?)

Compared to other Neuroptera, which have an extensive, sometimes extremely abundant, fossil record, green lacewings are not known from that many fossils, and these are not generally well-studied. Their prehistoric relatives mentioned above, however, indicate that at least the basal radiation of the Chrysopoidea must have happened in the Jurassic already, if not earlier.

†subfamily Limaiinae Martins-Neto and Vulcano 1988 

 †Aberrantochrysa Khramov 2018 Khasurty, Russia, Early Cretaceous (Aptian)
 †Araripechrysa Martins-Neto and Vulcano 1988 Crato Formation, Brazil, Aptian
 †Baisochrysa Makarkin 1997 Karabastau Formation, Kazakhstan, Middle/Late Jurassic (Callovian/Oxfordian) Zaza Formation, Russia, Aptian
 †Drakochrysa Yang and Hong 1990 Laiyang Formation, China, Aptian
 †Limaia Martins-Neto and Vulcano 1988 Crato Formation, Brazil, Aptian
 †Mesypochrysa Martynov 1927 Daohugou, China, Callovian, Karabastau Formation, Kazakhstan, Callovian/Oxfordian, Durlston Formation, United Kingdom, Early Cretaceous (Berriasian), Yixian Formation, China, Aptian Dzun-Bain Formation, Mongolia, Aptian, Khasurty, Zaza Formation, Russia, Aptian
 †Parabaisochrysa Lu et al. 2018 Burmese amber, Myanmar, Late Cretaceous (Cenomanian)
 †Protochrysa Willmann and Brooks 1991 Kamloops Group, Canada, Fur Formation, Denmark, Eocene (Ypresian)

Footnotes

References
This article draws heavily on the corresponding article in the German-language Wikipedia.
 Engel, Michael S. & Grimaldi, David A. (2007): The neuropterid fauna of Dominican and Mexican amber (Neuropterida, Megaloptera, Neuroptera). American Museum Novitates 3587: 1–58. PDF fulltext
 New, T. R. (2002): Prospects for extending the use of Australian lacewings in biological control. Acta Zoologica Academiae Scientiarum Hungaricae 48(Supplement 2): 209–216. PDF fulltext
 Winterton, S. L. & Brooks, S. J. (2002): Phylogeny of the apochrysine green lacewings (Neuroptera: Chrysopidae: Apochrysinae). Annals of the Entomological Society of America 95(1): 16–28.  PDF fulltext

Further reading

 Brooks, S. J. & Barnard. P. C. (1990): The green lacewings of the world: a generic review (Neuroptera: Chrysopidae). Bulletin of the British Museum of Natural History (Entomology) 59(2): 117–286.
 Penny, N. D.; Adams, P. A.; Stange, L. A. (1997): Species Catalog of the Neuroptera, Megaloptera, and Raphidioptera of America North of Mexico. Proceedings of the California Academy of Sciences 50(3): 39–114.
 Tauber, C. A. (2004): A systematic review of the genus Leucochrysa (Neuroptera: Chrysopidae) in the United States. Annals of the Entomological Society of America 97(6): 1129–1158.  
 Winterton, S. L. (1995): A new genus and species of Apochrysinae (Neuroptera: Chrysopidae) from Australia, with a checklist of Australian Chrysopidae. Journal of the Australian Entomological Society 34(2): 139–145.

External links 

 Green Lacewing: diagnostic photographs and information
 GMO Safety: Bt maize pollen poses no risk to green lacewings
 UniProt Taxonomy
Green lacewings of Florida on the UF / IFAS Featured Creatures website.

 
Neuroptera families